Bergama is a populous district, as well as the center city of the same district, in İzmir Province in western Turkey. By excluding İzmir's metropolitan area, it is one of the prominent districts of the province in terms of population and is largely urbanized at the rate of 53.6%. Bergama district area neighbors the areas of three districts of Balıkesir Province to its north, namely Ayvalık, Burhaniye and İvrindi, İzmir Province district of Kınık and Manisa Province district of Soma, Manisa to its east, while to the south it is bordered by the central provincial of Manisa and two other İzmir Province districts along the coast that are Aliağa and Dikili from its south towards its west. The district area's physical features are determined by the alluvial plain of Bakırçay River.

Name
The name Bergama, as well as its ancient predecessor Pergamon, are thought to be connected with the even more ancient Luwian language adjective "parrai" (Hittite language equivalent; "parku"), meaning "high" in the same vein as being the etymological root of a number of other ancient cities across Anatolia. In Turkish language, it has been adapted to Bergama. The name of Pergamos derives from Perga (as keramos from kera=earth, clay), although a Turkish author  Özhan Öztürk claims that Bergama means "high settlement/base" in Hittite language, while Argoma (modern Suluova) in Amasya means "border settlement" at the Hittite-Kaskian border.

General features
Currently, known for its cotton, gold, and fine carpets, the city was the ancient Greek and Roman cultural center of Pergamon; its wealth of ancient ruins continues to attract considerable tourist interest today, although its famous Temple has been moved to the Pergamon Museum, in Berlin, Germany.

The ruins of the ancient city of Pergamon lie to the north and west of the modern city; Roman Pergamon is believed to have sustained a population of approximately 150,000 at its height in the 1st century AD.

Among Bergama's notable ruins are the Sanctuary of Asclepius (or Asclepeion), a temple dedicated to an ancient Greek god of healing, a Greek Theater, and the Red Basilica complex ("Kızıl Avlu" in Turkish) that straddles the Selinus River, a 2nd-century AD construction likely built by Hadrian. The town also features an archaeological museum.

History

The city of Pergamon was the capital of the Attalid dynasty from 281 BC to 133 BC and then became part of the Roman province of Asia. It remained under Eastern Roman rule in the Middle Ages except for Sassanid invasion in 620s, Umayyad invasion in 715 and Sultanate of Rum rule between 1074 and 1097. It was conquered by Karasids and then Aydinids in 1302. It was part of Ottoman Empire in 1337. During Ottoman rule, it was part of the Sanjak of Karesi between 1337 and 1868, in Saruhan one (Its centre was Manisa) between 1868 and 1877 and finally in İzmir one. From 1867 until 1922, Bergama was part of Aidin Vilayet. During the Turkish War of Independence, it was occupied by Greece on June 19, 1919, but came under Turkish control on September 14, 1922. The Greek Army burnt down the city while retreating in 1922.

Sights of interest within Bergama city

 Selçuk Minaret built in the 14th century
 Çukurhan caravanserai built in the 14th century
 Taşhan caravanserai built in 1432
 Great Mosque of Bergama built in 1399 
 Şadırvanlı Mosque built in 1550
 Zeus Altar (Now in Berlin Museum)
 Acropolis - accessible by the Bergama Acropolis Gondola from the base station north east of the town
 Asklepion

Bergama is also known for its historic quarter, where old Ottoman houses in the traditional style are found.

Allianoi

Allianoi is an ancient spa settlement, with remains dating predominantly from the Roman Empire period (2nd century AD) located near the city of Bergama (ancient Pergamon) in Turkey's İzmir Province.

One particularity of Allianoi is its being a very recent historical discovery. It was mentioned only once in the 2nd century by the orator and medicinal writer Aelius Aristides in his "Hieroi Logoi" (Sacred Tales) (III.1), one of the key sources for the knowledge on the science of healing as it was understood at that time. No other writer of antiquity nor any epigraphic finding known had referred to Allianoi.

Kozak Plateau

The plain is a favorite regional excursion area, famed for its hand-made textile products and pine forests whose pine nut is also extensively exported.

Ovacık gold mine
Recently, Bergama also made headlines in the context of controversies based on environmental concerns over the gold mine in Ovacık village.

Wind turbine manufacturing 
LM Wind Power, a division of GE Renewable Energy, opened a wind turbine blade manufacturing facility in Bergama in 2017. The first blades it produced were used at the Bodangora Wind Farm in New South Wales, Australia.

Bergama Carpets

Bergama is also renowned for its high quality carpets. There are approximately eighty villages that still weave Bergama carpets. The history of carpet weaving in Bergama dates back to the 11th century - when Turkish migration started to the area. Bergama carpets have almost always been woven with wool - an attestation to the pastoral life style of the Yörük clans populating the area at the time.

Although the history of carpet weaving in Bergama dates back to the 11th century, most surviving carpets do not age more than 200 years - mainly due to their wool content. The oldest surviving Bergama carpets can be found in mosques in and around Bergama, as well as the archaeological museum in Bergama.

Bergama Festival
Between June 18–24, Bergama celebrates its annual festival "Bergama Kermesi", which is already running into its seventy-second anniversary. Bergama Kermesi is a major local event, generally celebrated with the attendance of Turkish celebrities, singers, players, poets, and writers.

International relations

Twin towns - sister cities
Bergama is twinned with:

 Alkmaar, Netherlands
 Asenovgrad, Bulgaria
 Baalbek, Lebanon
 Böblingen, Germany
 Lefka, Cyprus
 Nea Peramos, Greece
 Orhei, Moldova
 Pergamos, Cyprus
 Piatra Neamț, Romania
 Rosoman, North Macedonia
 Sanski Most, Bosnia and Herzegovina
 Yehud, Israel

See also
 Bergama carpet
 Allianoi

References

External links

 pointsfromturkey.com
 Rosa Valderrama, "Pergamum": brief history
 Photographic tour of old and new Pergamon, including the museum
 Pergamon pictures
 Pergamon altar in Berlin

 
Cities in Turkey
Ancient Greek archaeological sites in Turkey
Roman sites in Turkey
Populated places in İzmir Province
Districts of İzmir Province